Maliarpha validella is a species of snout moth in the genus Maliarpha. It was described by Zerny in 1917, and is known from Sudan (including Sennar, the type location).

References

Moths described in 1917
Anerastiini